The following is a list of managers of PAS Giannina FC.

Manageria history 
The complete list of PAS Giannina managers is shown in the following table:

References 

Lists of association football managers by club in Greece
PAS Giannina F.C. managers